Rural Cemetery is located on 180 Grove Street in Worcester, Massachusetts. More than 13,000 people are buried at the cemetery, including congressmen, mayors, governors, and professional people.

History
The cemetery was incorporated in 1838 on the quiet outskirts of town, at the suggestion of Edward D. Bangs in 1837 to serve as the town's cemetery, the older cemeteries having been neglected, overpopulated, or trampled by livestock. David Waldo donated rolling, treed land he purchased for $1400 in September 1837. It was located on the road leading to Holden from Worcester, which was previously owned by Judge Timothy Paine. The state legislature passed the bill and signed by Governor Edward Everett to incorporate the "Proprietors of Rural Cemetery in Worcester". A portion of the land was set aside for a garden and the design included shrubs, trees and "other rural ornaments".

A key goal in the founding of the rural cemetery was to create an ongoing memorial to the people who had passed in the trend established by "America's first garden cemetery" or "rural cemetery", Mount Auburn Cemetery which was founded in Massachusetts in 1831 with classical monuments set in a rolling landscaped terrain.

By the 1860s rural cemeteries could be found on the outskirts of cities and smaller towns across the country.

It was originally situated on 24 acres, and is now 40 acres in area.

Notable interments

 Charles Allen (1797–1869), United States House of Representatives
 George Bancroft (1800–1891), U.S. Secretary of the Navy, historian
 Abijah Bigelow (1775–1860), U.S. Representative member
 George B. Boomer (1832–1863), Union Army Brigadier General
 Alexander Bullock (1816–1882), Governor of Massachusetts
 Jonas Gilman Clark (1815–1900), businessman, philanthropist and founder of Clark University
 John Davis (1787–1854), United States House of Representatives, Governor of Massachusetts
 John Milton Earle (1794–1874), businessman, abolitionist and statesman
 Aldus Chapin Higgins (1872–1948), businessman and lawyer
 John Woodman Higgins (1874–1961), Higgins Armory Museum owner
 Rockwood Hoar (1855–1906), United States House of Representatives member
 Helen M. Knowlton (1832–1918), painter, author and educator
 Levi Lincoln Jr. (1772–1868), United States House of Representatives, Governor of Massachusetts
 Levi Lincoln Sr. (1749–1820), United States Attorney General, U.S. Secretary of State, Massachusetts Governor
 William Whitney Rice (1826–1896), United States House of Representatives member
 George W. Richardson (1808-1888), mayor of Worcester
 John Randolph Thayer (1845–1916), United States House of Representatives member
 Scofield Thayer (1889–1982), poet and publisher
 Isaiah Thomas (1749–1831), American Revolutionary, newspaper publisher and author
 Joseph H. Walker (1829–1899), United States House of Representatives member
 Ruth Sawtell Wallis (1895 – 1978), anthropologist
 Wilson Dallam Wallis (1886 – 1970), anthropologist
 George Hull Ward (1826–1863), Brigadier General, Union Army
 Charles G. Washburn (1906–1911), United States House of Representatives member
 Robert M. Washburn (1868–1946), politician and writer
 Fanny Bullock Workman (1859–1925), travel writer and mountaineer

See also
 Hope Cemetery (Worcester, Massachusetts)

References

Further reading
 Levi Lincoln. An address delivered on the consecration of the Worcester Rural Cemetery, Sept. 8, 1838 / by Levi Lincoln. Dutton and Wentworth, printers; 1838.

External links
 https://www.facebook.com/Rural-Cemetery-Crematory-111672228864393/
 

Cemeteries in Worcester, Massachusetts
Rural cemeteries